Midhun Manuel Thomas is an Indian film director and screenwriter who works in the Malayalam film industry.

Personal life 
Midhun married Fibi on 1 May 2018 at St Sebastian's Church, Paralikkunnu, Wayanad. He has a son born in 2020.

Career 
Thomas began his career in the Malayalam film industry in 2014 as the scriptwriter of the film Ohm Shanthi Oshaana, directed by Jude Anthany, starring Nivin Pauly and Nazriya Nazim. His directorial debut movie was 2015's Aadu, starring Jayasurya, Vijay Babu and Sunny Wayne. Later he directed Ann Maria Kalippilaanu (2016), Alamara (2017), Aadu 2 (2017) and Argentina Fans Kaattoorkadavu (2019). In 2020, he directed Anjaam Pathiraa.

Filmography

References

External links

Living people
People from Wayanad district
Film directors from Kerala
Malayalam film directors
Malayalam screenwriters
1983 births
Screenwriters from Kerala